Schaper is a German and Dutch surname.  Notable people with it include:

Edzard Schaper (1908–1984), German author
Hermann Schaper (1911–2002), German SS officer and war criminal
Robert N. Schaper (1922–2007), American evangelical theologian and seminary professor
W. Herbert Schaper (1914–1980), American inventor of board games and founder of W. H. Schaper Manufacturing Co..

See also
Michiel Schapers (born 1959), Dutch tennis player

German-language surnames